Panopticons is an arts and regeneration project of the East Lancashire Environmental Arts Network managed by Mid Pennine Arts.  It involved the construction of series of 21st century landmarks, or Panopticons (structures providing a comprehensive view), across East Lancashire, England, as symbols of the renaissance of the area. Four large scale sculptures were commissioned, designed and constructed over a six-year period for the districts of Blackburn, Burnley, Pendle and Rossendale.

The Halo in Haslingden (Rossendale) was the last sculpture in the series to be erected, in September 2007. Plans for a similar sculpture in Accrington were never realised. One artist's impression showed a different design.

Sculptures

The Atom
Set in the landscape of Pendle, the Atom was designed by Peter Meacock, Andrew Edmunds and Katarina Novomestska of Peter Meacock Projects. It was launched by Mayor of Pendle, Councillor George Adams, with Anthony Wilson and designer Peter Meacock, on 22 September 2006. The bronze coated glass fiber reinforced concrete structure provides both a work of art and a viewing point and shelter from which to enjoy the surrounding landscape.

Part of this sculpture has since been vandalised and removed.

Colourfields
Colourfields in Blackburn is a collaboration between Jo Rippon Architecture and artist Sophie Smallhorn. The design uses the former cannon battery in Corporation Park as its base. Colourfields was launched by the Mayor of Blackburn with Darwen, Councillor Dorothy Walsh, on the 14 June 2006.

Haslingden Halo
The Halo is an artwork set on the expended landfill site (or "top 'o' slate") overlooking the town of Haslingden in Rossendale, positioned to be clearly visible from the M66 and A56 approach to Lancashire. The Halo was the fourth and final Panopticon to be constructed in Lancashire, and was launched in September 2007.

The Halo is an 18m diameter steel lattice structure supported on a tripod five metres above the ground. The core is open at the top, framing views of the sky. It is lit after dark, using low energy LEDs powered by an adjacent wind turbine, and glows a sky blue colour, giving the effect of hovering above the town. It was designed by John Kennedy of LandLab.

Singing Ringing Tree
The Singing Ringing Tree is a musical sculpture overlooking Burnley. It was designed by architects Mike Tonkin and Anna Liu of Tonkin Liu, and constructed from pipes of galvanised steel. Singing Ringing Tree was launched by the Mayor of Burnley, Councillor Mohammad Najib, JP, and designers Mike Tonkin and Anna Liu on 14 December 2006.

Notes and references

Panopticons, New landmarks for the 21st century (Official site from the East Lancashire Environmental Arts Network).

Rossendale Borough Council. 2006-09-19. Item No. D7. Halo Panopticon. Retrieved 2007-11-29.

Buildings and structures in Lancashire
Outdoor sculptures in England
Architecture in England